Brigadier General John Allen "Jack" Hilger (11 January 1909 – 3 February 1982) was a United States Air Force officer and deputy commander of the Doolittle Raid during World War II. He went on serve in a series of command and staff posts for the remainder of the war and also in the Korean War.

Born in Sherman, Texas, Hilger graduated from Agricultural and Mechanical College of Texas with an degree in mechanical engineering. He was commissioned in the U.S. Army Air Corps in 1935 and on the outbreak of World War II. He was assigned to the 89th Reconnaissance Squadron as commander; flying North American B-25 Mitchell bombers on anti-submarine patrols. Selected by Lieutenant Colonel Jimmy Doolittle for what became known as the Doolittle Raid, he piloted one of the B-25s that bombed Nagoya in Japan on 18 April 1942. Subsequently awarded the Distinguished Flying Cross, he later served as commander of the 307th Bomb Group and flew missions during the Korean War. He served as the Chief of the United States element for the NATO planning group LIVE OAK. On November 30, 1966 he retired from the Air Force, at the rank of brigadier general. He died in San Antonio, Texas at the age of 73.

Early life
On January 11, 1909 John Allen Hilger was born in Sherman, Texas. He was one of four sons born to John Frederick and Emma Viola Hilger. He was a graduate of Sherman High School in 1926.

Following his graduation from high school in 1926, he attended the Agricultural and Mechanical College of Texas. Despite abandoning his studies in 1929, due to fiscal issues, he returned in the fall of 1931, marrying Ina Mae Smith the same year. He graduated with a bachelor of science degree in mechanical engineering in 1932. During his time in Texas A&M, he was part of its military program and a member of the American Society of Mechanical Engineers.

Hilger's military career began in May 1932 as a second lieutenant in the Infantry Reserve. He entered the U.S. Army Air Corps flying school in February 1933 as a flying cadet. He received his wings and was placed on active duty in the Air Corps in February 1934.

His first duty assignment after completion of pilot training was at March Field, California, where he served as an assistant base adjutant, a pilot, and commander photographic section on the base. By March 1937, Hilger was divorced and he remarried to Virginia Hope Botterud in Los Angeles. The couple had two children. In October 1939, Hilger was transferred to McChord Field, Washington, in May 1940 was appointed as commander of the 89th Reconnaissance Squadron in September of that same year. He remained at McChord Field flying North American B-25 Mitchell bombers on anti-submarine patrols until February 1942. During this period, he was promoted to captain and later to major.

World War II

Doolittle Raid

Hilger was assigned as the deputy commander of the mission for the "Doolittle Raid", by Lieutenant Colonel Jimmy Doolittle. He trained along with the men and the planes were assembled at Eglin Field, Florida. They prioritized short takeoffs during training.

The mission was intended to be a retaliatory response to the December 7, 1941 Japanese attack on Pearl Harbor. The raid was daring not only because of the intended targets, the Japanese homeland, but because the pilots trained to take-off in a B-25 bomber from the deck of an aircraft carrier, something neither the designers of the B-25, nor the aircraft carrier, ever envisioned. Hilger was pilot in the fourteenth bomber, No. 40–2344, to depart the deck of the USS Hornet during the mission. On April 18, 1942, Hilger and his B-25's four crewmembers, took off from the Hornet earlier than planned due to fears the aircraft carrier had been detected by the Japanese, and reached Nagoya in Japan. They bombed their targets; barracks near the Nagoya Castle and a Mitsubishi Aircraft factory. They then headed for their recovery airfield in China. They were low on fuel becasue of the raid's early launch, the B-25s did not reach ay of the safety zones in China. Hilger and his crew bailed out over the city of Shangrao in Jiangxi Province, China. When Hilger bailed out of his aircraft, he was jarred when the parachute opened and he incurred minor injuries. He and his crew linked up after the bailout and were helped through Japanese lines by Chinese guerrillas and civilians. After two days, they arrived in Quzhou. On April 30, in Chungking, Hilger, Doolittle and other crew members were decorated by Madame Chiang Kai-shek.

After the raid, Hilger returned to the United States. On June 27, 1942, commanding officer of the U.S. Army Air Forces Hap Arnold awarded the Distinguished Flying Cross to Hilger along with twenty-two other airmen  at Bolling Field, Washington D.C. In July 1942, he was honored at Texas A&M, where he gave a speech alongside Ensign George H. Gay Jr., a Texas A&M alumni and sole survivor of Torpedo Squadron 8 during the Battle of Midway.

Later war service

In September 1942, Hilger promoted to colonel. From that same month, he commanded 320th and 344th Bomb Groups in Florida, which were equipped with B-26 Marauder bombers, until July 1943.

From July to October 1943, Hilger served in with the 14th Air Force in Kunming, China as the commander of the Operational Training Unit Bomb Group in the China Burma India Theater. He also commanded the 1st Bomb Group of the Chinese-American Composite Wing, but was prohibited from flying combat missions due to fear that he would be executed by the Japanese if captured, due to his participation in the Doolittle Raid.

When he returned to the United States, Hilger was sent to Orlando, Florida to become the Chief of the Organization Division with Headquarters Army Air Force Tactical Center; he was stationed in Florida from November 1943 to June 1944. From July to September 1944, he served as an Assistant Chief of the Evaluation Division with an Army Air Force Base Unit at Orlando. For the last 12 months of World War II, Hilger served in the Western Pacific as the special plans officer on the staff of Admiral Chester Nimitz, who was the commander-in-chief Pacific area.

Hilger's younger brother Lieutenant Ted Hilger served in the U.S. Navy and was killed in action on March 2, 1942, when his destroyer USS Pillsbury was sunk by an Imperial Japanese Navy cruiser with all hands, approximately 200 miles east of Christmas Island. He was officially declared dead on November 25, 1945, and his name is listed in the Walls of the Missing at the Manila American Cemetery.

Cold War
Hilger was assigned to Army Air Force headquarters in January 1946. He worked in the Pentagon where he served as chief of internal policy—a branch of the plans division—until August 1948. He then attended the Air War College and, after graduation, was assigned to the 307th Bomb Wing as commander. The 307th is located at MacDill Air Force Base in Florida. From September 1949 to March 1950, he served as commander of the 
306th Bomb Group, which was also at MacDill.

 
During the Korean War, Hilger was assigned as the 307th Bomb Group's commander and the unit moved to Kadena Air Base in Okinawa, where they flew combat missions in B-29 Superfortresses. He also saw service within the 307th Bomb Wing staff and then as commander of the 307th BW at Kadena AFB, from December 1950 to April 1951. He then served as director of operations in the headquarters of the 6th Air Division, MacDill Air Force Base, until he entered the National War College at Washington D.C., in August 1951.

In July 1952, Hilger was assigned as chief of the allocations division—directorate of operations—in the Pentagon until July 1955 when he was reassigned as commander of the Air Force Operational Test Center at Air Proving Ground Command in Eglin Air Force Base. He was promoted to brigadier general in October 1956 and continued to command the operational test center until June 1957. Hilger's next assignment took him to Turkey where he served as commander of the U.S. Air Force Group in the Joint U.S. Military Mission for Aid to Turkey, from June 1957 until June 1959.

From July 1959 to July 1961, he served as chief of staff, Allied Air Forces in Northern Europe (NATO) in Oslo, Norway. He next served at Randolph Air Force Base in Texas as Chief of Staff of Air Training Command from August 1961 to July 1964. He then served as the Deputy Chief of Staff for LIVE OAK, and as Chief of the United States Element for LIVE OAK, from July 1964. On November 30, 1966 he retired from the Air Force.

Later life
After his retirement from the military, Hilger worked on the United States Atomic Energy Commission and for a time he lived in Las Vegas. In early 1982, after his full retirement, he settled at the Air Force Village in San Antonio, Texas.

On February 3, 1982, Hilger died at the age of 73. In accordance to his wishes, his body was cremated and ashes scattered in the Pacific Ocean near the shore of Newport Beach, California.

On November 9, 2001, Hilger and 12 other Doolittle Raiders who were born in Texas were inducted into the Texas Aviation Hall of Fame at the Lone Star Flight Museum in Galveston.

Awards and decorations
During his lengthy career, Hilger earned many decorations, including:

References

Notes

Bibliography

Further reading

1909 births
1982 deaths
People from Sherman, Texas
Sherman High School (Texas) alumni
Recipients of the Silver Star
Recipients of the Legion of Merit
Recipients of the Distinguished Flying Cross (United States)
Recipients of the Air Medal
Texas A&M University alumni
United States Army Air Forces bomber pilots of World War II
United States Army Air Forces colonels
United States Air Force personnel of the Korean War
American Korean War bomber pilots
National War College alumni
NATO military personnel
Military personnel from Texas
Aviators from Texas
Doolittle Raiders
United States Air Force generals
Burials at sea